"The Death of Me" is a song by British rock band Asking Alexandria. It is the band's third single from their third studio album, From Death to Destiny. The single was released on 28 March 2013 via the Sumerian Records YouTube page.

Track listings 
Digital 45 
The Death of Me - 4:18
The Death of Me (Rock Mix) - 3:24

Rock Mix 

On 16 April 2013, the band released a 'rock mix' for the song as the fourth single of the album. Later, on 22 July, they released a music video for the 'rock mix'. The rock mix was featured as a bonus track for the From Death to Destiny album. It was mixed by Kevin Churko, who is known for his work with Ozzy Osbourne, Five Finger Death Punch, and In This Moment.

Music video 
The music video starts when a man (portrayed by Danny Worsnop) finds a kid and brings him to a dark room, with imprisoned and naked women, where the man and his band performs. The women are in vending machines, and the man provides a coin for the boy. Each of the imprisoned women represent different addictions: cocaine, pills, alcohol, and heroin. Each of the women try to 'persuade' the boy to take them. In the end, the boy "buys into" the heroin addiction/girl. Money starts flowing from the ceiling, indicating the massive amounts of money spent on the chosen addiction. The other girls become angry, and all of them break out of the vending machines. 
This represents certain band member's addictions, which started as a young boy. The song itself is about Worsnop overcoming, and ending, his addiction. The video uses the rock mix of the song.

Other versions 
On 1 March 2014, Asking Alexandria released via YouTube an acoustic version of the song.

Personnel 
 Danny Worsnop – lead vocals, additional guitar
 Ben Bruce – lead guitar, backing vocals
 Cameron Liddell – rhythm guitar
 Sam Bettley – bass
 James Cassells – drums

References 

2013 singles
Asking Alexandria songs
2013 songs
Songs written by Ben Bruce
Songs written by Danny Worsnop
Sumerian Records singles